The Guana Batz are an English psychobilly band who formed in 1982 in Feltham, West London, England. The band are most well known for their frequent appearances at the Klub Foot, an early psychobilly club.

History
The original group members were Pip Hancox (vocals), Stuart Osborne (guitar), Dave "Diddle" Turner (drums) and Mick Wigfall (upright bass). Wigfall was removed by Osborne early on, who preferred a bass guitar player for the band. Mick White soon joined the band as bass guitarist. However, by 1984, the Guana Batz decided to again feature an upright bassist, and replaced White with Sam Sardi.

Turner quit the band in May 1987, the hectic touring schedule having grown too much for him, and opted to devote his time to his girlfriend and his construction job. He was replaced by former Get Smart bass player, Jonny Bowler. When Sardi left the band, Bowler switched to upright bass, and John Buck joined the band on drums. Mark Pennington of the Caravans played upright bass for the band after Sam Sardi left and prior to Johnny Bowler switching to bass.

Hancox's Staffordshire Bull Terrier, Pig Dog, was humorously referred to as the band's "fifth member." After being hit by a car, he was replaced by Hancox's new dog, Muttley, who would be featured on four Guana Batz album covers. Although Muttley has died, he reportedly lived to an old age.

The band broke up in 1990, but reunited in 1996. They are still touring today. Osborne also plays with The Unknowns. Buck still lives in London; Hancox and Bowler have relocated to San Diego, California and they have occasionally performed in the southern California area with ex-Stray Cats members under the moniker the Guana Cats.

In 2001, Turner died from a stroke and, in 2018, Bowler departed from the band.

The band continues to headline major festivals around the world, and have more recently built their US following, with their Stateside line-up featuring Eric Razo (FEAR, Henchmen, Viva Hate) on guitar, Victor Mendez (The Rhythm Shakers) on bass, and Jared Hren on drums.

Discography

Singles

Albums

See also
List of psychobilly bands

References

External links
Guana Batz information page at Wreckingpit.com

British psychobilly musical groups
Musical groups established in 1983
Musical groups from London